BSU may refer to:
Bangladesh Students Union, a political organization in Bangladesh
Baluchistan States Union, a province of Pakistan that existed from 1952 to 1955
Baptist Student Union
Behavioral Science Unit, the former name for the Federal Bureau of Investigation's Behavioral Analysis Unit
BISU Union, the Student Union of Beijing International Studies University (BISU)
British Seafarers' Union
Britannia Staff Union
Federal Bureau for Maritime Casualty Investigation (Bundesstelle für Seeunfalluntersuchung, BSU)

Universities 
Baku State University
Ball State University, Indiana, USA
Batangas State University Apolinario R. Apacible School of Fisheries (BatSU)
Bath Spa University, UK
Beijing Sport University
Belarusian State University
Bemidji State University
Benguet State University (BengSU)
Boise State University, Idaho, USA
Bowie State University, Maryland, USA
Bukidnon State University (BukSU)
Bulacan State University (BulSU)
Bridgewater State University, Massachusetts, USA